Robert Molesworth may also refer to:

Robert Molesworth, 1st Viscount Molesworth of Swords (1656–1725), Anglo-Irish landowner and statesman
Robert Molesworth, 5th Viscount Molesworth (1729–1813)
Robert Molesworth (judge) (1806–1890), Irish-born Australian Chief Justice and Solicitor-General
Robert Molesworth, 12th Viscount Molesworth (born 1959)

See also